Polygrammate is a monotypic moth genus of the family Noctuidae. Its only species, Polygrammate hebraeicum, the Hebrew moth or Hebrew, is found in the eastern parts of North America, from Ontario, south to Florida and as far west as Texas. Both the genus and the species were first described by Jacob Hübner in 1818.

The wingspan is 23–39 mm. Adults are on wing from May to August.

The larvae feed on black gum trees.

References

External links

"Polygrammate hebraeicum Hebrew Moth". NatureServe Explorer. Retrieved May 23, 2020.

Acronictinae
Moths of North America
Moths described in 1818
Monotypic moth genera